Hadviga is an abandoned settlement in Brieštie in Turčianske Teplice District in the Žilina Region of northern central Slovakia.

History 
In historical records the village was first mentioned in 1392. It was named after founder's wife. The village belonged to a German language island. The German population was expelled in 1945.

Demography 
The settlement is currently uninhabitated and serves solely a recreational purpose.

References 

Villages and municipalities in Turčianske Teplice District